Equine massage is the practice of massage on horses. Beginning in the early 1990s, it has been a growing field of equine therapy, used for both day-to-day riding and post-trauma rehabilitation. Proponents list a number of positive effects, including the improvement of movement and the reduction of pain and stress responses.

Practice

Hands-on therapies, including massage, acupressure, and joint mobilization, were some of the fastest growing equine therapy categories in the early 1990s.

Equine massage uses the hands, fingers, and elbows of the therapist, and other tools, including tennis balls and vibrating tools. During the massage, the soft tissue is manipulated with the goal of loosening tight muscles, joints, tendons, scar tissue, and edema; increasing blood flow and lymphatic activity; and reducing stress. Equine massage is used in exercise warm-up and  after injury or for surgery rehabilitation.

A variety of equine massage techniques are used depending on the aims of the case. These include effleurage, petrissage, compression, cross fibre massage, tapotement, trigger point therapy and myofascial release. Benefits that can be observed include:
Increased blood flow, metabolism and lymphatic drainage, increased or decreased muscle tone depending on the technique, pain relief, relaxation.

Scientific study

Massage in horses uses many techniques first used for human massage, and it is becoming more common in both competitive equestrian disciplines and pleasure riding. Proponents say that equine massage improves movement and reduces pain and stress responses. Massage affects the muscular system at the cellular and fascial levels, as well as physiologic systems. Preliminary research demonstrates possible benefits in exercise recovery, but additional rigorous research is needed to further examine these possibilities.

A 2013 study of 20 riding horses examined the differences in equine behavior among horses resting, receiving a massage, and receiving a treatment of Tellington TTouch method created by Linda Tellington-Jones. The study determined that the horses receiving TTouch had the highest levels of relaxed and positive behaviors, while the resting horses showed signs of boredom and the horses receiving massage therapy tended to move around more and behave in a less relaxed manner.

Regulation, training, and associations
In the United States, the legal requirements vary by state and are determined by each state's veterinary board. Presently, some states require veterinary supervision, while others do not. Many schools offer certification programs in the areas of animal and companion massage. Some of these schools are approved by the National Certification Board for Therapeutic Massage and Bodywork.  The International Association of Animal Massage and Bodywork  is an association of animal massage and bodywork practitioners, including equine massage therapists.

References

Horse health
Massage